The crested white-eye or crested ibon (Heleia dohertyi) is a species of bird in the family Zosteropidae.
It is endemic to the Lesser Sunda Islands (Sumbawa and Flores).

Its natural habitats are subtropical or tropical moist lowland forest and subtropical or tropical moist montane forest.

References

crested white-eye
Birds of the Lesser Sunda Islands
Birds of Flores
crested white-eye
Taxonomy articles created by Polbot